Rukmini is a Hindic feminine given name and a surname that may refer to the following notable people:

Given name
Rukmani Bai, Indian politician
 Rukmani Devi (1923–1978), Sri Lankan film actress and singer
Rukmani Gounder, New Zealand economist

Surname
Kumari Rukmani (1929–2007), Indian actress and dancer
T. S. Rukmani, Indian Sanskrit scholar

See also
Rukmini (given name)

Indian feminine given names